Anand Bhushan Pandey was member of the Bharatiya Janata Party from Bihar. He has won the Bihar Legislative Assembly election in 2015 from Bhabua. He died on 30th November, 2017.

References

People from Kaimur district
Bharatiya Janata Party politicians from Bihar
Bihar MLAs 2015–2020
Year of birth missing
Lok Janshakti Party politicians